John Winter may refer to:
John Winter (architect) (1930–2012), English architect
John Winter (athlete) (1924–2007), Australian high jumper
John Winter (cricketer) (1851–1914), English cricketer
John Winter (Newfoundland politician) (1806–1891), English-born physician and political figure in Newfoundland
John Winter (producer) (born 1956), Australian producer of Rabbit-Proof Fence
John Winter (Royalist) (c. 1600–1676), English landowner, ironmaster and participant in the English Civil War
John Charles Winter (1923–2012), cathedral organist
John Strange Winter (1856–1911), pen name of English novelist Henrietta Eliza Vaughan Stannard
John Winter (Wyoming politician), member of the Wyoming House of Representatives
Louis Krages (1949–2001), also known as "John Winter", German race car driver and businessman
John Wynter (1555–1638), also known as "John Winter", English sailor

See also
Jonathan Winter (born 1971), New Zealand Maori Olympic backstroke swimmer
Johnny Winter (1944–2014), John Dawson Winter III, American blues guitarist
John D. Winters (1916–1997), American historian at Louisiana Tech University
Jonathan Winters (1925–2013), American comedic actor
Jock Winter (1803–1875), nickname of John Winter, Australian pastoralist